was a Japanese samurai warrior of the Sengoku period. He was known as one of the "Twenty-Four Generals of Takeda Shingen". He is also well known as a painter. 

It has been said that Nobukado and Shingen were as like as two peas therefore he served as body double for Shingen.

When Nobunaga attacked Oshima castle Nobukado was defending, Nobukado escaped from the castle without fighting but he ended up being captured and beheaded.

Family
Father: Takeda Nobutora (1493-1574)
Brothers:
 Takematsu (1517-1523)
Takeda Shingen (1521-1573)
 Inuchiyo (1523-1529)
Takeda Nobushige (1525-1561)
 Takeda Nobumoto
 Matsuo Nobukore (ca. 1530s-1571)
 Takeda Souchi
Takeda Nobuzane (ca. 1530s-1575)
Ichijō Nobutatsu (ca. 1539-1582)
Sisters:
 Joukei-in (1519-1550), married Imagawa Yoshimoto
 Nanshou-in (born 1520) married Anayama Nobutomo
 Nene (1528-1543) married Suwa Yorishige

In popular culture 
Nobukado is one of the main characters in Akira Kurosawa's film Kagemusha, the role of Nobukado was played by Tsutomu Yamazaki.

References

Further reading
Turnbull, Stephen (1998). 'The Samurai Sourcebook'. London: Cassell & Co.

External links 
  "Legendary Takeda's 24 Generals" at Yamanashi-kankou.jp

1529 births
1582 deaths
Samurai
People executed by Japan by decapitation
Takeda clan
16th-century executions by Japan
Executed Japanese people
Takeda retainers